Delmer J. Yoakum (December 6, 1915 – October 25, 1997) was an American fine artist, oil and watercolor painter, designer, serigrapher, Disneyland and Hollywood motion picture studio scenic artist.

Early life
Del Yoakum was born in St. Joseph, Missouri. Throughout his childhood, he was surrounded by artists. His mother was a painter. After dismissing his hope of studying music, painting became his passion. As a boy in the late 1930s, he received a scholarship for four consecutive years to study each summer with Thomas Hart Benton at Kansas City Art Institute. After serving in the United States Navy during World War II, he came to Los Angeles and studied with Henry Lee McFee, Phil Dike, and Rico Lebrun; and at Chouinard Art Institute, Jepson Art Institute, and the University of Southern California's Roski School of Fine Arts.

Professional life
 
Yoakum's occupation was that of a Painter - Designer - Motion Picture Artist in Hollywood, California from 1952-1972. Over 21 years, he worked for Paramount, 20th Century Fox, and MGM; and did special assignments for Walt Disney Studios. During this time he also did his own fine art painting in his own studio. Among his many accomplishments during his long career, he painted the Grand Canyon and Primeval World Diorama scenery (viewable from the train of Disneyland Railroad), portions of Pirates of the Caribbean, It's a Small World and the Haunted Mansion at Disneyland in California.

He also painted scenery for movies such as The Shoes of the Fisherman for which he recreated the panel about the life of Moses, and parts of the Last Judgment by Michelangelo, for the interior of the Sistine Chapel (MGM Studios). He created the city of Jerusalem for The Robe (which won the 1953 Academy Award for Best Art Direction–Set Decoration, Color), after which he created a fantastic 600 foot cyclorama that backed the safari camp set of The Snows of Kilimanjaro. Other films he created dioramic scenes for included Billy Wilder's Some Like It Hot (nominated for the 1959 Best Art Direction-Set Decoration, Black-and-White Oscar), The King and I, Niagara,  Alfred Hitchcock's North by Northwest (the Mount Rushmore scene) and many others. During his term at 20th Century Fox, he also worked on many of the Marilyn Monroe pictures, and even one of the Elvis Presley movies.

Yoakum's work has been exhibited in over 50 galleries, associations, museums, festivals, schools, colleges, fairs and art shows. He also contributed paintings to a number of invitational group shows including two in Mexico. He received over 30 awards and his paintings also received national recognition in art publications, including a number of art books and several art magazines over the years.

Personal life
Del was married to his wife Barbara Yoakum for over 50 years. He had three children; Robert, Bob and Cathleen. He lived in Sedona, Arizona for more than 25 years. He was a lifelong Democrat and a committed Christian, who even painted Christ's Crucifixion (which hangs in England's Coventry Cathedral) and Resurrection (which is in the permanent collection of St. Luke's Episcopal Church in Sedona).

Publications
Who's Who in American Art
Who's Who in the West
American Artist Magazine
Newport Magazine Cover
The Illustrator (Magazine)
Dictionary of International Biography
Art News Magazine
International Directory (Cambridge, England)
"Landscapes" (Book), Davis Publications, Inc., 1977
Arizona Highways (Magazine), 1981
Road Runner (Book Cover), 1985 
American Artists (Book), 1985
The California Style (Book), 1985
Sedona Heritage: Arizona Artists (Book), 1997
Kudos (Magazine), 2006

Memberships
National Watercolor Society (Past President 1961 and Honorary Life Member)
Inglewood Art League (Honorary Life Member)
Artist Equity Board Member (1951 through 1955)
National Society of Literature and the Arts
Sedona Art Center, Sedona, Arizona

Awards

National GI Exhibit, - Grand Prize - 1948 - Santa Monica, CA
Adahl Hyde Morrison Silver Medal 2nd Award -Oakland, CA
Frye Museum - Edouvard Manet Award - 1958 - Seattle, WA
Santa Monica Arts, Ass'n - 1st Prize - 1948 & 1949 - Santa Monica, CA
Hawthorne Methodist Church - Grand Award - Hawthorne, CA
Deluca Award, Las Vegas, NV
Inglewood Art League - 1st Award - Inglewood, CA
California State Fair - Honorable Mention Award
Riverside Art Ass'n - 3rd Award - 1966 - Riverside, CA
Downey Museum of Art - Honorable Mention Award - 1969
City of Avalon Best of Show - 1967 - Avalon, CA (see image at right)
John Marin Memorial Award - Watercolor USA - 1971
St. Raymonds - 1st Prize - 1971 - Thousand Oaks, CA
Hawthorne Art Festival - 2nd Award - 1971 - Hawthorne, CA
Arches Paper Award - National Watercolor Society - 1971
Inglewood Art League - 1st Award - 1970 - Inglewood, CA
Hawthorne Art Festival - 1st Award - 1970 - Hawthorne, CA
San Bernardino Art Ass'n - 2nd Award - San Bernardino, CA
Catalina Art Ass'n - Honorable Mention Award - 1967
Catalina Art Ass'n - 3rd Award - 1968
California State Fair - Honorable Mention Award - 1966 - Sacramento, CA
Frye Museum - Honorable Mention Award - 1963 - Seattle, WA
Inglewood Art League - Best of Show - 1969
Arizona State Fair - Honorable Mention Award - 1973
Arizona State Fair - Cash Award - 1974
Arizona State Fair - Public Appeal Award - 1980
Arizona State Fair - 1st Place Cash Award - 1984
Arizona State Fair - Honorable Mention Award (WC) - 1986
Coconino County Fair - 1st Prize - 1973 and 1974
Laguna Beach Museum of Art Award - National Watercolor Society - 1975
Jerome Art Center - 1st Prize WC - 1985
Best of Show - WC - 1985 - Winslow, AZ
1st Place - Oil - 1985 - Winslow, AZ
1st Place - WC - 1985 - Winslow, AZ
Honorable Mention Award - Oil - Winslow, AZ

(WC = Water Color)

Permanent collections
Butler Institute of American Art, Oil
San Diego Art Museum, Watercolor
National Watercolor Society, purchase, Motion Picture Art Director
Newport High School
Las Vegas art Association, Nevada Power and Electric
Glendale Federal Savings and Loan, Glendale, Ca
Brussels, Belgium, Page J. Thibodeaux
Washburn School
Coventry Cathedral, Coventry, England, Oil
St. Luke's Episcopal Church, Sedona, AZ, Oil
Sedona High School
Sedona Chamber of Commerce
Many Private Collections

Exhibited
Los Angeles Museum 1947-1950, 1952, 1954–1955, 1957 and 1958
Denver Museum 1953, 1954, and 1960
Pennsylvania Academy of Fine Arts 1957, 1969, and 1970
The Butler Institute of American Art 1953, 1955, 1957–1959, 1964, 1967–1971, 1975–1978, 1980–1985
Oakland Art Museum 1949, 1950, 1952, 1957, 1966, and 1967
San Diego Art Museum 1954
Watercolor USA 1966, 1968–1973, and 1975
University of Washington 1954
Hawthorne Art Festival 1967-1969, and 1971
National Watercolor Society 1954, 1956–1976, 1980, 1982–1985
DeYoung Museum 1962
Los Angeles Art Association 1946, 1949, 1951, and 1953
Frye Museum 1958, 1959, 1961–1965
Newport High School 1953-1957, 1959–1961
American Artist Galleries 1949
National Orange Show 1947, 1949, 1952, 1956, 1957, 1964, 1966, and 1967
Arizona State Fair 1948, 1973–1977, 1980–1986
John Ringling Museum 1959 and 1960
Long Beach Museum 1959, 1960, and 1962
San Francisco Art Association 1959
Dulin Gallery of Art 1964
Virginia Museum 1958 and 1962
Las Vegas Art Association 1959, 1963, 1965, and 1968
Pasadena Museum 1954, 1955, 1957, 1959, and 1961
Palos Verdes Art Gallery 1958 and 1969
Henry Gallery 1954
Richmond Art Gallery 1958-1969, and 1963
Pacific Art Festival 1949
California Palace Legion of Honor 1955-1957, 1959, and 1961
Wichita Kansas Centennial 1970
St. Raymonds, Thousand Oaks, California 1970
Tucson Art Museum 1964
Los Angeles Miracle Mile 1965, 1966–1968
Los Angeles Municipal Art Gallery 1946-1948, and 1950
California State Fair 1951, 1955–1958, 1962, 1966, 1968, and 1970
Inglewood Art League 1961-1969
Riverside Art Association 1966 and 1971
Riverside National Date Festival Exhibit 1966
Santa Monica Art Association 1949 and 1958
Downey Museum of Art 1969
Los Angeles City Art Festival 1965-1971
Catalina Art Association 1966-1971
Cerritos College 1967
La Mirada Art Association 1967 and 1968
Laguna Beach Art Show 1969
Los Angeles Home Show 1967 and 1978
Mainstreams (Marietta, Ohio) 1968
Glendale Fine Arts Center (Glendale AZ) 1984 and 1985
Sedona Arts Center (Sedona AZ) 1981 and 1986
Winslow, AZ 1985 and 1986
Jerome Art Center (Jerome AZ) 1986
Santa Paula 1958, 1961–1963, 1967, 1968, and 1970
Grand Canyon Diorama, Disneyland 1958–present

Quotations

Regarding Del Yoakum:

 (Les Krantz, American Artists)
 (Isabel McCord Stroud, Sedona Heritage: Arizona Artists)
 (Lucas O. Seastrom, Welcome to the Disneyland Railroad Grand Canyon Diorama Tribute!!)

External links
Delmer J. Yoakum, "Hollywood Scenic Artist"
Ask Art: Del Yoakum
Multibello: Delmer J. Yoakum

This Day in Disney History: DEC 06
Welcome to the Disneyland Railroad Grand Canyon Diorama Tribute!!
Road-Runner! book featuring paintings of Del Yoakum's "Delmer J. Yoakum of Sedona did beautiful watercolor paintings of roadrunners which were used for the front and back covers of the book."
Ask ART: Henry Lee McFee
Ask ART: Phil Dike
Ask ART: Rico Lebrun

1915 births
1996 deaths
Painters from California
20th-century American painters
American male painters
USC Roski School of Fine Arts alumni
Kansas City Art Institute alumni
People from St. Joseph, Missouri
Painters from Missouri
United States Navy personnel of World War II
20th-century American male artists